The Bitectiporidae is a family within the bryozoan order Cheilostomatida. Colonies are encrusting on shells and rocks or upright bilaminar branches or sheets. The zooids generally have at least one adventitious avicularia on their frontal wall near the orifice. The frontal wall is usually covered with small pores and numerous larger pores along the margin. The ovicell, which broods the larvae internally, is double-layered with numerous pores in the outer layer, and sits quite prominently on the frontal wall of the next zooid.

Classification 
 Family Bitectiporidae
 Genus Bitectipora
 Genus Cribella
 Genus Hippomonavella
 Genus Hippoporina
 Genus Hippothyris
 Genus Kermadecazoon
 Genus Metroperiella
 Genus Neodakaria
 Genus Nigrapercula
 Genus Parkermavella
 Genus Pentapora
 Genus Pseudoflustra
 Genus Schizomavella
 Genus Schizosmittina

References 

Cheilostomatida
Bryozoan families
Extant Eocene first appearances